Jay Cassidy is an American film editor with more than 30 credits since 1978.

Cassidy began his career in the 1970s working on documentaries and political advertising. He has had a notable collaboration with Sean Penn, having edited all of the films directed by Penn. Early in his career, Cassidy edited the documentary film High Schools (1984) that was directed by Charles Guggenheim; more recently he has edited several documentaries by Guggenheim's son Davis Guggenheim, including An Inconvenient Truth (2006).

Cassidy was nominated for the Academy Award for Best Film Editing and for an ACE Eddie Award for Into the Wild (directed by Sean Penn - 2007). In 2012, he was nominated for his second Academy Award for Best Film Editing for Silver Linings Playbook, which won the Eddie and the Satellite Award for Best Editing.  Cassidy was nominated for a third Academy Award for American Hustle (directed by David O. Russell - 2013), and again won the Eddie for that film. He had won the Eddie for Best Documentary Editing for An Inconvenient Truth (directed by Davis Guggenheim - 2006). Both High Schools and An Inconvenient Truth were nominated for the Academy Award for Best Documentary Feature, and An Inconvenient Truth won the award.

Cassidy has been elected to membership in the American Cinema Editors.

Cassidy received a bachelor's degree from the University of Michigan circa 1972 and was a photographer for The Michigan Daily and the Michiganensian on campus. In 2006, Cassidy won the 39th Cartoon Caption Contest of The New Yorker magazine.

The Best of May, 1968, a short film directed by Cassidy in 1972,  was preserved by the Academy Film Archive in 2019.

Filmography

Amsterdam (2022)
The King of Staten Island (2020)
Birds of Prey (2020)
A Star Is Born (2018)
Thank You for Your Service (2017)
The Last Face (2016)
Joy (2015)
Fury (2014)
Foxcatcher (2014)
American Hustle (2013) 
Silver Linings Playbook (2012)
From the Sky Down (2011)
Seeking Justice (2011)
Waiting for Superman (2010)
Conviction (2010)
Brothers (2009)
Johnny Got His Gun (2008)
A Mother's Promise: Barack Obama Bio Film (2008)
Into the Wild (2007)
First Snow (2006)
An Inconvenient Truth (2006)
The Assassination of Richard Nixon (2004)
Ballistic: Ecks vs. Sever (2002)
Tuck Everlasting (2002)
11'09"01 September 11 (2002)
The Pledge (2001)
Gossip (2000)
Urban Legend (1998)
The Replacement Killers (1998)
Albino Alligator (1996)
The Crossing Guard (1995)
Brainscan (1994)
Bodies, Rest & Motion (1993)
The Indian Runner (1991)
Norman and the Killer (1991)
Frankenstein Unbound (1990)
Fright Night Part 2 (1988)
Aloha Summer (1988)
The Making of Liberty (1986)
Roadhouse 66 (1984)
High Schools (1983)
Waltz Across Texas (1982)
The End of August (1982)
HR 6161: An Act of Congress (1979)
Almost Crying (1978)
The Thorn (1974)
Jerusalem Lives (1973)

References

External links

 Filmography including television. Lists directors, production companies, notable awards & nominations.

American film editors
American Cinema Editors
University of Michigan alumni
AFI Conservatory alumni
Living people
Year of birth missing (living people)